Ana María Crespo de las Casas (born 30 March 1948, Santa Cruz de Tenerife) is a Spanish lichenologist noted for studying the phytosociology, taxonomy and floristics of Mediterranean lichens. She was awarded the 2012 Acharius Medal from the International Association for Lichenology for lifetime achievements in lichenology, and the genera Crespoa, Cresponea and Cresporhaphis were named in her honor.

See also
 :Category:Taxa named by Ana Crespo

References

1948 births
Spanish women scientists
Spanish lichenologists
Acharius Medal recipients
Living people